Hansjörg Hirschbühl (born 21 May 1937) was a Swiss bobsledder who competed in the early 1950s. He won a bronze medal in the four-man event at the 1960 FIBT World Championships in Cortina d'Ampezzo.

References
Bobsleigh four-man world championship medalists since 1930

Living people
Swiss male bobsledders
1937 births
Place of birth missing (living people)
20th-century Swiss people